Abbie Larkin (born 27 April 2005) is an Irish professional footballer who plays as a forward for Shamrock Rovers and the Republic of Ireland women's national team.

Club career
Larkin is from Ringsend and played youth football for the local team Cambridge FC. At nine years old Larkin was accepted into The Metropolitan Girls League Academy two years earlier than the usual admission age of 11. She also played at youth level for Home Farm, before joining Shelbourne.

In May 2021, Shelbourne manager Noel King dual-signed Larkin to the club's senior panel from their Women's Under 17 National League squad. She scored on her senior club debut, after entering play as an 84th-minute substitute for Saoirse Noonan in Shelbourne's 5–0 Women's National League win over Athlone Town at Tolka Park on 5 June 2021.

In October 2021 Larkin made her first start for Shelbourne when Noelle Murray fell ill and was unable to play in a league match against Galway. Player of the match Larkin scored one goal and served one assist in Shelbourne's 2–0 win, which was televised live by TG4. Shelbourne overhauled Peamount United on a dramatic final day to win the 2021 Women's National League title. Larkin also played in the 2021 FAI Women's Cup Final, but Shelbourne were beaten 3–1 by Wexford Youths.

Shelbourne announced that Larkin had signed for another season at the end of a successful 2022 Women's National League campaign, in which she helped the club secure a League and Cup double. However they were disappointed when Larkin subsequently experienced "a change of heart" and instead moved to newly-reformed Shamrock Rovers alongside some other Shelbourne players. A controversial and swiftly-deleted tweet on the Shelbourne club account, referencing The Red Flag lyrics 'Though cowards flinch and traitors sneer', was perceived as being aimed at the departing players and attracted "huge criticism", particularly given Larkin's youth.

International career

Youth

Larkin represented Ireland at schoolgirl level while she attended Ringsend College. She progressed to the Republic of Ireland women's national under-17 football team and served as captain in their 2022 UEFA Women's Under-17 Championship qualification campaign.

Senior

Larkin was called up to the senior Republic of Ireland squad for the first time in February 2022, for the 2022 Pinatar Cup in Murcia. She required her parents' permission to miss school for the trip. She won her first cap on 19 February 2022 in a 1–0 defeat by Russia and appeared as a half-time substitute for Kyra Carusa in a 1–0 win over Wales.

On 27 June 2022, Larkin scored her first goal for Ireland on the occasion of her fourth cap, in a 9–0 2023 FIFA Women's World Cup qualification – UEFA Group A win over Georgia in Gori. Coach Vera Pauw was impressed by Larkin's impact: "She's only 17-years-old, but I hope that everybody has seen how talented she is."

References

External links
 
 

2005 births
Living people
Republic of Ireland women's association footballers
Republic of Ireland women's international footballers
Women's association football forwards
Shelbourne F.C. (women) players
Association footballers from Dublin (city)
Republic of Ireland women's youth international footballers